Bror Julius Olsson Nordfeldt (April 13, 1878 – April 21, 1955) was an American artist who painted seascapes and depictions of New Mexico's indigenous culture.

Background
He was born in Tullstorp, Malmö, Skåne County, Sweden  the son of Nils and Ingrid (Nordfeldt) Olsson. The family immigrated to the United States in 1892. He first worked as a typesetter for the Swedish language newspaper, Det Rätta Hemlandet. He attended the Art Institute of Chicago and studied with Frederick Richardson. He later apprenticed with Albert Herter in New York City, and studied in Paris at the Académie Julian. For several years he worked as an illustrator in Europe and North Africa for Harper's Magazine, where he also practiced etching. He adopted his mother's surname to avoid confusion with the maritime artist (Alfred) Julius Olsson, whose work was then becoming popular in Europe and America.

Career
During World War I he was in San Francisco where he registered for the draft. During the war, Nordfeldt was assigned to San Francisco to supervise the camouflage of merchant ships. After his service in World War I, he went to Santa Fe, New Mexico upon the suggestion of William Penhallow Henderson and ended up moving there. Norfeldt was an early member of the Provincetown Printers art colony in Massachusetts. In 1921, Nordfeldt was elected an associate member of the Taos Society of Artists. He exhibited his work frequently with the Chicago Society of Etchers both before and after the war, showing between 1911-1918 and 1926–1929. In 1940 he relocated to Lambertville, New Jersey.

Throughout the 1930s, Nordfeldt taught at various schools including Utah State College,  the Wichita Art Association and the Minneapolis School of Art. From 1941 to 1943, he was a guest professor for the Department of Art of the University of Texas.

Nordfeldt worked in diverse styles and media, including etchings and prints, portraiture, still lifes, and landscapes. Nordfeldt strove for a flattening of form and distortion of space, creating stylized images. He chose subjects laden with emotional power, especially nature and religious scenes.

Nordfeldt exhibited in numerous museums and galleries and received many significant awards and prizes in the course of his career. His works are held in the Art Institute of Chicago, the Hirshhorn Museum, the New York Public Library, New Mexico Museum of Art, Metropolitan Museum of Art, Newberry Library, Two Red Roses Foundation, and the Weisman Art Museum, as well as many other venues. Biographical sketches for Nordfeldt are published in most standard art reference works. His papers are held in the Manuscript Collections of the Archives of American Art.

Personal life
Nordfelt was first married to Dr. Margaret Doolittle in 1910.  They divorced in 1944.  His second marriage was to fellow artist Emily L. Abbott in 1944 in New Jersey.

Death
 He died in Henderson, Texas on April 21, 1955.

Awards
 1906 Silver Medal, International Print Exhibition in Milan, Italy
 1915 Silver Medal, Panama–Pacific International Exposition in San Francisco, California
 1926 Bronze Medal, Sesquicentennial Exposition in Philadelphia, Pennsylvania
 1926 Logan Medal of the Arts from the Art Institute of Chicago in Chicago, Illinois
 1927 First Prize, Brooklyn Society of Etchers in Brooklyn, New York
 1928 First Prize, Chicago Society of Etchers in Chicago, Illinois
 1937 Yetter Prize for Painting from the Denver Art Museum
 1947 Purchase Prize for Painting from the Worcester Art Museum
 1949 Bronze Medal, from the Corcoran Gallery of Art in Washington, D.C.

Notes

References
 Haugan, Reidar Rye.    Prominent Artists and Exhibits of Their Work in Chicago (Chicago Norske Klub. Nordmanns-Forbundet, 24: 371–374,Volume 7, 1933)
Hunter, Sam. B.J.O. Nordfeldt: An American Expressionist (1984)
Swanson, Mary T. The Immigrant Molds the Image: the Life of B.J.O. Nordfeldt (Swedish American Historical Quarterly. Vol. XLII. April 1991. pp. 69–89)
Crump, Robert L. Minnesota Prints and Printmakers, 1900-1945 (Minneapolis: Minnesota Historical Society Press, 2009)
Mellby, Julie. 'The Drypoints of B.J.O. Nordfeldt', Print Quarterly. Vol. XXXIII. No. 1. March 2017. pp. 42–52

External links

Swedish-American Works from the Hillstrom Collection
B. J. O. Nordfeldt works at New Mexico Museum of Art

1878 births
1955 deaths
People from Lambertville, New Jersey
People from Malmö
Swedish emigrants to the United States
20th-century American painters
American male painters
School of the Art Institute of Chicago alumni
Académie Julian alumni
Artists from Santa Fe, New Mexico
Taos Society of Artists
20th-century American male artists